Manankoro is a town and seat of the commune of Sibirila in the Cercle of Bougouni in the Sikasso Region of southern Mali.

References

Populated places in Sikasso Region
Ivory Coast–Mali border crossings